Ebrahimabad (also Romanized as Ebrāhīmābād) is a village in Koleyn Rural District of Fashapuyeh District of Ray County, Tehran province, Iran. At the 2006 National Census, its population was 1,242 in 284 households. The following census in 2011 counted 3,135 people in 783 households. The latest census in 2016 showed a population of 3,530 people in 808 households; it was the largest village in its rural district.

References 

Ray County, Iran

Populated places in Tehran Province

Populated places in Ray County, Iran